New Zealand bank account numbers in NZD follow a standardised format of 16 digits:
 a prefix representing the bank and branch (six digits), otherwise known as the Bank code;
 the body (seven digits); and
 the suffix representing the product/account type (two or three digits).

While the New Zealand format is similar to Australia's Bank State Branch, the two systems are not interchangeable.

New Zealand bank account numbers in foreign currencies vary by bank.

Background 
The origins of the format lay in the establishment of the Databank Systems Limited, a company set up by a consortium of competing New Zealand banks, to provide computing resources (development and operational) for the consortium members.

Bank codes are coordinated by Payments NZ who administer the Bulk Electronic Clearing System (BECS). The scope of BECS includes direct debits, automatic payments, bill payments, and direct credits. Payments NZ also administer the following payment systems in New Zealand:
 Paper Clearing System
 High Value Clearing System
 Consumer Electronic Clearing System

Format of account numbers 
Account numbers are generally presented in the format:
 BB-bbbb-AAAAAAA-SSS

where B is the bank number (2 digits), b is the branch number (4 digits), A is the account number (7 digits) and S are digits of the suffix (2 or 3 digits). Where a bank displays the suffix as two digits, a leading zero is added to pad the suffix to three digits; i.e. BB-bbbb-AAAAAAA-SS becomes BB-bbbb-AAAAAAA-0SS.

This format allows customers to have a single account number with differing suffixes for multiple accounts of differing types. This does not include credit card and loan products.

Account number prefix 
Bank accounts are prefixed with six digits, two indicating the bank and four which indicate the branch. The table below shows which banks are allocated which bank prefix.  A current list of branches as their associated bank/branch numbers is available for download from the Payments NZ website.

Account number body 
The account body consists of seven digits, right adjusted and padded with zeroes if necessary. The last digit of the body is a check digit which can be validated using a modulus algorithm.

Account number suffix 
The table below shows the account number suffixes as introduced by Databank Systems Limited from 1969.

Some banks (such as BNZ) include three digits of the suffix in their presentation of the number to the end customer. Other banks only show the last two digits of the suffix to the end customer. Technically, all banks have three digit suffixes, it's just that the first digit of the suffix is always 0 so it's usually ignored.

See also 
 Bank code
 Bank State Branch, the bank code format used in Australia
 Databank Systems Limited
 ISO 9362, the standard for SWIFT codes, international bank identifiers
 ABA routing transit number, the bank code format used in the United States
 Routing number (Canada), the bank code format used in Canada 
 Sort code, a number used in the United Kingdom

References 

Banking in New Zealand
Banks of New Zealand
Bank codes